Trichosea tamsi is a moth of the family Noctuidae. It is endemic to Sumatra.

Pantheinae
Moths described in 1924